Aaron Banks may refer to:
 Aaron Banks (American football) (born 1997), American football offensive lineman
 Aaron Banks (martial artist) (1928–2013), American martial artist

See also
Arron Banks (born 1966), British political donor
Aaron Bank (1902–2004), United States Army officer; founded the US Army Special Forces (the "Green Berets")